Albert Edward Longstaff (9 October 1885 – July 1970) was an English professional footballer who played at outside right or inside right.

He started his career at Shoreham when he was 17. In 1907 he signed with Brighton & Hove Albion. He stayed with Brighton until 1922, during which time he won the 1909–10 Southern League title and the 1910 FA Charity Shield and played in the club's first year in the Football League Third Division South, in 1921–22, which was his last season with the club. He scored 86 goals from 443 appearances in all senior competitions.

After he left Brighton he got permission from the Football Association to play as an amateur again for Shoreham, where he finished his footballing career.

His younger brother Harvey played Southern League football for Albion.

References

1885 births
1970 deaths
People from Shoreham-by-Sea
English footballers
Association football forwards
Shoreham F.C. players
Brighton & Hove Albion F.C. players
Southern Football League players
English Football League players